Mika Hedman (born 14 June 1965) is a Finnish former professional tennis player.

Career
The son of Davis Cup player Heikki Hedman competed on the professional tour in the 1980s. He himself represented the Finland Davis Cup team on one occasion, against Cyprus in 1987. In front of a home crowd in Helsinki, he partnered with Olli Rahnasto in the doubles rubber to defeat their Cypriot opponents in straight sets.

Hedman had a career high singles ranking of 415 and reached the final qualifying round at the 1984 Australian Open. In doubles he was ranked as high as 189 in the world, with two Grand Prix main draw appearance in 1986, at Hilversum and Kitzbühel.

Challenger titles

Doubles: (1)

See also
List of Finland Davis Cup team representatives

References

External links
 
 
 

1965 births
Living people
Finnish male tennis players
Sportspeople from Helsinki